Wilson's Allen (1914–1939) was an influential early Tennessee Walking Horse sire. Although he himself was not used as a show horse, he sired the first three World Grand Champions of his breed.

Life

Wilson's Allen was a Tennessee Walking Horse stallion foaled in 1914 (some sources say 1917) in Coffee County, Tennessee. He was bred by Bud Messick at the urging of Johnson Hill, who contracted to buy the colt for $200. Wilson's Allen was by the foundation sire Roan Allen and out of a mare named Birdie Messick. The breeding created a stir in the area because Roan Allen and Birdie Messick were both sired by Black Allan. That mating is considered by some to be the first deliberate act of inbreeding within the Tennessee Walking Horse breed. Wilson's Allen was a chestnut with a left hind sock. Wilson's Allen was taken to Johnson Hill's farm at five months old. When he reached maturity, he was started under saddle by Hill's nephew Steve Hill, who later became a successful horse trainer.

Johnson Hill died in 1922 and Wilson's Allen was sold to Bibb Kirby. By then the horse had lost an eye and was referred to as "Kirby's one-eyed horse". Kirby tried to breed Wilson's Allen but did not have much success. In 1928 Wilson's Allen was sold to Frank Wilson, who immediately stood him at stud, with considerable success.

Death and burial
Wilson's Allen died in 1939 and was actually buried three different times. The first burial was right after his death, and the grave was located at Steve Hill's stables, but in 1975 the horse's body was exhumed and taken to Middle Tennessee State University (MTSU), where he was buried on the campus. Later, his grave was moved to a new location near the MTSU Horse Science Center, where it remains to this day.

Offspring

Wilson's Allen sired a total of 482 foals. Among them were five of the first ten World Grand Champions: Strolling Jim, winner in 1939; Haynes Peacock, winner in 1940 and 1941; Melody Maid, winner in 1942; City Girl, winner in 1944; and Midnight Sun, winner in 1945 and 1946. It is estimated that of the nearly 70 horses who have won the World Grand Championship, only three do not trace in a direct line back to Wilson's Allen.

Pedigree

References

Individual Tennessee Walking Horses
1914 animal births
1939 animal deaths
Individual male horses